The English Virginalist School usually refers to the English keyboard composers of the late Tudor and early Jacobean periods. The term virginalist does not appear to have been applied earlier than the 19th century. Although the virginals was among the most popular keyboard instruments of this period, there is no evidence that the composers wrote exclusively for this instrument, and their music is equally suited to the harpsichord, the clavichord or the chamber organ.

The term is sometimes also applied to other northern European composers of this period, such as Jan Pieterszoon Sweelinck and Samuel Scheidt.

English virginalists

John Blitheman
John Bull
William Byrd
Benjamin Cosyn
Giles Farnaby
Richard Farnaby
Orlando Gibbons
Edmund Hooper
William Inglott
Thomas Morley
John Munday
Martin Peerson
Peter Philips
Ferdinando Richardson
Nicholas Strogers
William Tisdale
Thomas Tomkins
Thomas Weelkes

Collections 

The Mulliner Book
The Dublin Virginal Manuscript
My Ladye Nevells Booke
Susanne van Soldt Manuscript
Fitzwilliam Virginal Book
Clement Matchett's Virginal Book
Parthenia (music)
Priscilla Bunbury's Virginal Book
Elizabeth Rogers' Virginal Book
Anne Cromwell's Virginal Book

See also 
Virginals

References

Sources

Further reading
Charles Van den Borren, Les origines de la musique de clavier en Angleterre, Brussels, 1912 (Reprint : Louvain, 1979)
Walter Niemann, Die Virginalmusik, Leipzig, 1919
Margaret Glyn, About Elizabethan Virginal Music and its Composers, London, 1924 (revised 1934)
R.L. Adams, The Development of Keyboard Music in England during the English Renaissance, Diss., University of Washington, 1960
Willi Apel, The History of Keyboard Music to 1700, Indiana University Press, 1972, p. 156–164, 253–258, 278–287, 293–323. 

English Renaissance
Renaissance composers
Stuart England